Emperor Jing may refer to:

 Emperor Jing of Han (188-141 BC)
 Emperor Jing of Jin (208-255)
 Emperor Jing of Wu (235-264)
 Emperor Jing of Liang (543-558)
 Emperor Jing of Northern Zhou (573-581)
 Emperor Jing of Western Liang

th:จักรพรรดิจิง